Neurotrauma, brain damage or brain injury (BI) is the destruction or degeneration of brain cells. Brain injuries occur due to a wide range of internal and external factors. In general, brain damage refers to significant, undiscriminating trauma-induced damage.

A common category with the greatest number of injuries is traumatic brain injury (TBI) following physical trauma or head injury from an outside source, and the term acquired brain injury (ABI) is used in appropriate circles to differentiate brain injuries occurring after birth from injury, from a genetic disorder (GBI), or from a congenital disorder (CBI). Primary and secondary brain injuries identify the processes involved, while focal and diffuse brain injury describe the severity and localization.

Recent research has demonstrated that neuroplasticity, which allows the brain to reorganize itself by forming new neural connections throughout life, provides for rearrangement of its workings. This allows the brain to compensate for injury and disease.

Signs and symptoms
Symptoms of brain injuries vary based on the severity of the injury or how much of the brain is affected. The three categories used for classifying the severity of brain injuries are mild, moderate or severe.

Severity of injuries

Mild brain injuries 
Symptoms of a mild brain injury include headaches, confusions, tinnitus, fatigue, changes in sleep patterns, mood or behavior. Other symptoms include trouble with memory, concentration, attention or thinking. Mental fatigue is a common debilitating experience and may not be linked by the patient to the original (minor) incident.

Moderate/severe brain injuries 
Cognitive symptoms include confusion, aggressiveness, abnormal behavior, slurred speech, and coma or other disorders of consciousness. Physical symptoms include headaches that worsen or do not go away, vomiting or nausea, convulsions, abnormal dilation of the eyes, inability to awaken from sleep, weakness in extremities and loss of coordination.

Symptoms in children 
Symptoms observed in children include changes in eating habits, persistent irritability or sadness, changes in attention, or disrupted sleeping habits.

Location of brain damage predicts symptoms
Symptoms of brain injuries can also be influenced by the location of the injury and as a result impairments are specific to the part of the brain affected. Lesion size is correlated with severity, recovery, and comprehension. Brain injuries often create impairment or disability that can vary greatly in severity.

In cases of severe brain injuries, the likelihood of areas with permanent disability is great, including neurocognitive deficits, delusions (often, to be specific, monothematic delusions), speech or movement problems, and intellectual disability. There may also be personality changes. The most severe cases result in coma or even persistent vegetative state. Even a mild incident can have long-term effects or cause symptoms to appear years later.

Studies show there is a correlation between brain lesion and language, speech, and category-specific disorders. Wernicke's aphasia is associated with anomia, unknowingly making up words (neologisms), and problems with comprehension. The symptoms of Wernicke's aphasia are caused by damage to the posterior section of the superior temporal gyrus.

Damage to the Broca's area typically produces symptoms like omitting functional words (agrammatism), sound production changes, dyslexia, dysgraphia, and problems with comprehension and production. Broca's aphasia is indicative of damage to the posterior inferior frontal gyrus of the brain.

An impairment following damage to a region of the brain does not necessarily imply that the damaged area is wholly responsible for the cognitive process which is impaired, however. For example, in pure alexia, the ability to read is destroyed by a lesion damaging both the left visual field and the connection between the right visual field and the language areas (Broca's area and Wernicke's area). However, this does not mean one with pure alexia is incapable of comprehending speech—merely that there is no connection between their working visual cortex and language areas—as is demonstrated by the fact that people with pure alexia can still write, speak, and even transcribe letters without understanding their meaning.

Lesions to the fusiform gyrus often result in prosopagnosia, the inability to distinguish faces and other complex objects from each other. Lesions in the amygdala would eliminate the enhanced activation seen in occipital and fusiform visual areas in response to fear with the area intact. Amygdala lesions change the functional pattern of activation to emotional stimuli in regions that are distant from the amygdala.

Other lesions to the visual cortex have different effects depending on the location of the damage. Lesions to V1, for example, can cause blindsight in different areas of the brain depending on the size of the lesion and location relative to the calcarine fissure. Lesions to V4 can cause color-blindness, and bilateral lesions to MT/V5 can cause the loss of the ability to perceive motion. Lesions to the parietal lobes may result in agnosia, an inability to recognize complex objects, smells, or shapes, or amorphosynthesis, a loss of perception on the opposite side of the body.

Non-localizing features
Brain injuries have far-reaching and varied consequences due to the nature of the brain as the main source of bodily control. Brain-injured people commonly experience issues with memory. This can be issues with either long or short-term memories depending on the location and severity of the injury. Sometimes memory can be improved through rehabilitation, although it can be permanent. Behavioral and personality changes are also commonly observed due to changes of the brain structure in areas controlling hormones or major emotions. Headaches and pain can also occur as a result of a brain injury either directly from the damage or due to neurological conditions stemming from the injury. Due to the changes in the brain as well as the issues associated with the change in physical and mental capacity, depression and low self-esteem are common side effects that can be treated with psychological help. Antidepressants must be used with caution in brain injury people due to the potential for undesired effects because of the already altered brain chemistry.

Long term psychological and physiological effects
There are multiple responses of the body to brain injury, occurring at different times after the initial occurrence of damage, as the functions of the neurons, nerve tracts, or sections of the brain can be affected by damage. The immediate response can take many forms. Initially, there may be symptoms such as swelling, pain, bruising, or loss of consciousness. Post-traumatic amnesia is also common with brain damage, as is temporary aphasia, or impairment of language.

As time progresses, and the severity of injury becomes clear, there are further responses that may become apparent. Due to loss of blood flow or damaged tissue, sustained during the injury, amnesia and aphasia may become permanent, and apraxia has been documented in patients. Amnesia is a condition in which a person is unable to remember things. Aphasia is the loss or impairment of word comprehension or use. Apraxia is a motor disorder caused by damage to the brain, and may be more common in those who have been left brain damaged, with loss of mechanical knowledge critical. Headaches, occasional dizziness, and fatigue—all temporary symptoms of brain trauma—may become permanent, or may not disappear for a long time.

There are documented cases of lasting psychological effects as well, such as emotional changes often caused by damage to the various parts of the brain that control human emotions and behavior. Individuals who have experienced emotional changes related to brain damage may have emotions that come very quickly and are very intense, but have very little lasting effect. Emotional changes may not be triggered by a specific event, and can be a cause of stress to the injured party and their family and friends. Often, counseling is suggested for those who experience this effect after their injury, and may be available as an individual or group session.

It is important to note that the long term psychological and physiological effects will vary by person and injury. For example, perinatal brain damage has been implicated in cases of neurodevelopmental impairments and psychiatric illnesses. If any concerning symptoms, signs, or changes to behaviors are occurring, a healthcare provider should be consulted.

Causes

Brain injuries can result from a number of conditions, including:
 trauma; multiple traumatic injuries can lead to chronic traumatic encephalopathy. A coup-contrecoup injury occurs when the force impacting the head is not only strong enough to cause a contusion at the site of impact, but also able to move the brain and cause it to displace rapidly into the opposite side of the skull, causing an additional contusion.
 open head injury
 closed head injury
 penetrating: when a sharp object enters the brain, causing a large damage area. Penetrating injuries caused by bullets have a 91 percent mortality rate.
 deceleration injuries
 poisoning; for example, from heavy metals including mercury and compounds of lead
 Genetic disorder
 hypoxia, including birth hypoxia
 tumors
 infections
 stroke leading to infarct, which may follow thrombosis, embolisms, angiomas, aneurysms, and cerebral arteriosclerosis.
 neurological illness or disorders such as cerebral palsy, Parkinson's disease, etc.
 surgery
 Substance use disorder
 neurotoxins- pollution exposure or biological exposure (Annonaceae, rotenone, Aspergillus spores, West Nile fever, Viral meningitis)
 suicide attempt such as hanging, falling off from height, and even on rare occasion getting shot by a firearm, etc.
 acute total or REM sleep deprivation lasting longer than a day

Chemotherapy
Chemotherapy can cause brain damage to the neural stem cells and oligodendrocyte cells that produce myelin. Radiation and chemotherapy can lead to brain tissue damage by disrupting or stopping blood flow to the affected areas of the brain. This damage can cause long term effects such as but not limited to; memory loss, confusion, and loss of cognitive function. The brain damage caused by radiation depends on where the brain tumor is located, the amount of radiation used, and the duration of the treatment. Radiosurgery can also lead to tissue damage that results in about 1 in 20 patients requiring a second operation to remove the damaged tissue.

Wernicke–Korsakoff syndrome
Wernicke–Korsakoff syndrome can cause brain damage and results from a Vitamin B deficiency (specifically Vitamin B1, Thiamine). This syndrome presents with two conditions, Wernicke's encephalopathy and Korsakoff psychosis. Typically Wernicke's encephalopathy precedes symptoms of Korsakoff psychosis. Wernicke's encephalopathy causes bleeding in the thalamus or hypothalamus, which controls the nervous and endocrine system. Due to the bleeding, brain damage occurs causing problems with vision, coordination, and balance. Korsakoff psychosis typically follows after the symptoms of Wernicke's decrease and result from chronic brain damage. Korsakoff psychosis affect memory. Wernicke-Korsakoff syndrome is typically caused by chronic heavy alcohol use or by conditions that affect nutritional absorption, including colon cancer, eating disorders and gastric bypass.

Iatrogenic
Brain lesions are sometimes intentionally inflicted during neurosurgery, such as the carefully placed brain lesion used to treat epilepsy and other brain disorders. These lesions are induced by excision or by electric shocks (electrolytic lesions) to the exposed brain or commonly by infusion of excitotoxins to specific areas.

Diffuse axonal
Diffuse axonal injury is caused by shearing forces on the brain leading to lesions in the white matter tracts of the brain. These shearing forces are seen in cases where the brain had a sharp rotational acceleration, and is caused by the difference in density between white matter and grey matter.

Body's response to brain injury
Unlike some of the more obvious responses to brain damage, the body also has invisible physical responses which can be difficult to notice. These will generally be identified by a healthcare provider, especially as they are normal physical responses to brain damage. Cytokines are known to be induced in response to brain injury. These have diverse actions that can cause, exacerbate, mediate and/or inhibit cellular injury and repair. TGFβ seems to exert primarily neuroprotective actions, whereas TNFα might contribute to neuronal injury and exert protective effects. IL-1 mediates ischaemic, excitotoxic, and traumatic brain injury, probably through multiple actions on glia, neurons, and the vasculature. Cytokines may be useful in order to discover novel therapeutic strategies. At the current time, they are already in clinical trials.

Diagnosis 
Glasgow Coma Scale (GCS) is the most widely used scoring system used to assess the level of severity of a brain injury. This method is based on the objective observations of specific traits to determine the severity of a brain injury. It is based on three traits: eye opening, verbal response, and motor response, gauged as described below. Based on the Glasgow Coma Scale severity is classified as follows, severe brain injuries score 3–8, moderate brain injuries score 9–12 and mild score 13–15.

There are several imaging techniques that can aid in diagnosing and assessing the extent of brain damage, such as computed tomography (CT) scan, magnetic resonance imaging (MRI), diffusion tensor imaging (DTI) magnetic resonance spectroscopy (MRS), positron emission tomography (PET), and single-photon emission tomography (SPECT). CT scans and MRI are the two techniques widely used and are most effective. CT scans can show brain bleeds, fractures of the skull, fluid build up in the brain that will lead to increased cranial pressure. MRI is able to better to detect smaller injuries, detect damage within the brain, diffuse axonal injury, injuries to the brainstem, posterior fossa, and subtemporal and subfrontal regions. However, patients with pacemakers, metallic implants, or other metal within their bodies are unable to have an MRI done. Typically the other imaging techniques are not used in a clinical setting because of the cost, lack of availability.

Management

Acute
The treatment for emergency traumatic brain injuries focuses on assuring the person has enough oxygen from the brain's blood supply, and on maintaining normal blood pressure to avoid further injuries of the head or neck. The person may need surgery to remove clotted blood or repair skull fractures, for which cutting a hole in the skull may be necessary. Medicines used for traumatic injuries are diuretics, anti-seizure or coma-inducing drugs. Diuretics reduce the fluid in tissues lowering the pressure on the brain. In the first week after a traumatic brain injury, a person may have a risk of seizures, which anti-seizure drugs help prevent. Coma-inducing drugs may be used during surgery to reduce impairments and restore blood flow.

In the case of brain damage from traumatic brain injury, dexamethasone and/or Mannitol may be used.

Chronic
Various professions may be involved in the medical care and rehabilitation of someone with an impairment after a brain injury. Neurologists, neurosurgeons, and physiatrists are physicians specialising in treating brain injury. Neuropsychologists (especially clinical neuropsychologists) are psychologists specialising in understanding the effects of brain injury and may be involved in assessing the severity or creating rehabilitation strategies. Occupational therapists may be involved in running rehabilitation programs to help restore lost function or help re-learn essential skills. Registered nurses, such as those working in hospital intensive care units, are able to maintain the health of the severely brain-injured with constant administration of medication and neurological monitoring, including the use of the Glasgow Coma Scale used by other health professionals to quantify extent of orientation.

Physiotherapists also play a significant role in rehabilitation after a brain injury. In the case of a traumatic brain injury (TBI), physiotherapy treatment during the post-acute phase may include sensory stimulation, serial casting and splinting, fitness and aerobic training, and functional training. Sensory stimulation refers to regaining sensory perception through the use of modalities. There is no evidence to support the efficacy of this intervention. Serial casting and splinting are often used to reduce soft tissue contractures and muscle tone. Evidence based research reveals that serial casting can be used to increase passive range of motion (PROM) and decrease spasticity.  Functional training may also be used to treat patients with TBIs. To date, no studies supports the efficacy of sit to stand training, arm ability training and body weight support systems (BWS). Overall, studies suggest that patients with TBIs who participate in more intense rehabilitation programs will see greater benefits in functional skills. More research is required to better understand the efficacy of the treatments mentioned above.

Other treatments for brain injury can include medication, psychotherapy, neuropsychological rehabilitation, and/or surgery.

Prognosis

Prognosis, or the likely progress of a disorder, depends on the nature, location, and cause of the brain damage (see Traumatic brain injury, Focal and diffuse brain injury, Primary and secondary brain injury).

In general, neuroregeneration can occur in the peripheral nervous system but is much rarer and more difficult to assist in the central nervous system (brain or spinal cord). However, in neural development in humans, areas of the brain can learn to compensate for other damaged areas, and may increase in size and complexity and even change function, just as someone who loses a sense may gain increased acuity in another sense—a process termed neuroplasticity.

There are many misconceptions that revolve around brain injuries and brain damage. One misconception is that if someone has brain damage then they cannot fully recover. Recovery depends a variety of factors; such as severity and location. Testing is done to note severity and location. Not everyone fully heals from brain damage, but it is possible to have a full recovery. Brain injuries are very hard to predict in outcome. Many tests and specialists are needed to determine the likelihood of the prognosis. People with minor brain damage can have debilitating side effects; not just severe brain damage has debilitating effects. The side-effects of a brain injury depend on location and the body's response to injury. Even a mild concussion can have long term effects that may not resolve. Another misconception is that children heal better from brain damage. Children are at greater risk for injury due to lack of maturity. It makes future development hard to predict.  This is because different cortical areas mature at different stages, with some major cell populations and their corresponding cognitive faculties remaining unrefined until early adulthood. In the case of a child with frontal brain injury, for example, the impact of the damage may be undetectable until that child fails to develop normal executive functions in his or her late teens and early twenties.

History 
The foundation for understanding human behavior and brain injury can be attributed to the case of Phineas Gage and the famous case studies by Paul Broca. The first case study on Phineas Gage's head injury is one of the most astonishing brain injuries in history. In 1848, Phineas Gage was paving way for a new railroad line when he encountered an accidental explosion of a tamping iron straight through his frontal lobe. Gage observed to be intellectually unaffected but exemplified post injury behavioral deficits. These deficits include: becoming sporadic, disrespectful, extremely profane, and gave no regard for other workers. Gage started having seizures in February, dying only four months later on May 21, 1860.

Ten years later, Paul Broca examined two patients exhibiting impaired speech due to frontal lobe injuries. Broca's first patient lacked productive speech. He saw this as an opportunity to address language localization. It was not until Leborgne, informally known as "tan", died when Broca confirmed the frontal lobe lesion from an autopsy. The second patient had similar speech impairments, supporting his findings on language localization. The results of both cases became a vital verification of the relationship between speech and the left cerebral hemisphere. The affected areas are known today as Broca's area and Broca's Aphasia.

A few years later, a German neuroscientist, Carl Wernicke, consulted on a stroke patient. The patient experienced neither speech nor hearing impairments, but had a few brain deficits. These deficits included: lacking the ability to comprehend what was spoken to him and the words written down. After his death, Wernicke examined his autopsy that found a lesion located in the left temporal region. This area became known as Wernicke's area. Wernicke later hypothesized the relationship between Wernicke's area and Broca's area, which was proven fact.

See also

References

Further reading

External links 

 
 

Neurotrauma
Neurological disorders
Causes of death